Rabl may refer to:
 

 Rabl (company), a former Israeli chocolate and sweets manufacturer
 Revolutionary Anarchist Bowling League, a Minnesota defunct anarchist group
 Carl Rabl (1853–1917), Austrian anatomist and pioneer of cell cycle studies
 Rudolf Rabl (1889–1951), Czech-Jewish lawyer
 Walter Rabl (1873–1940), Viennese composer and conductor

See also
 RABL6, a gene that encodes human Rab-like protein 6